Basavanagowda Channabasavanagowda Patil is an Indian Kannada film actor turned politician who is the current Minister of State for Agriculture of Karnataka from 7 February 2020. (He is a three-term MLA from Hirekerur assembly constituency. B. C. Patil is a former cop,  and apart from acting, he has also worked as a producer and director in the Kannada Film Industry.)

Family and early life
B. C. Patil was born on 14 November 1956 to the couple Sri. Channabasavanagowda Patil and Smt. Shivamma. He is married to Smt. Vanaja and has two daughters, Sowmya and Srushti. After completing B.A., he joined the Karnataka Police department on 1 August 1979 and was trained at Police Training College, Mysore.

Acting career
B. C. Patil debuted in the Vishnuvardhan hit Nishkarsha. He has acted in the films Premachari, Kaurava, Shivappa Nayaka and Jogula. His performance in Nishkarsha was much appreciated by Vishnu. So far, he has acted in more than 25 films.

Filmography

 Nishkarsha (1993)
 Mahakshathriya
 Poornasatya
 Jaana
 Kiladigalu
Curfew
Maha Chatura
Nirbandha
Ellaranthalla Nanna Ganda
Jai Hind
Kaurava
 Chennappa Channegowda (1999)
Premachari
Hats Off India
Tiger Padmini
Astra
Krishnaarjuna
Shaapa
Kanoonu
Shivappa Nayaka
Surya IPS
Hattura Odeya
Chelvi
Jogula
Devasura
Zabardust
Dadagiri
 Dalavayi
 Bombugalu Saar Bombugalu(2007)
 Sri Kshetra Adi Chunchanagiri (2012)
 Pungi Daasa (2014)
 Ond Chance Kodi (2015)
 Happy New Year (2017)
 Kaafi Thota (2017)

References

External links

Website

Male actors in Kannada cinema
Indian male film actors
1956 births
Indian actor-politicians
Living people
Indian police officers
People from Haveri district
20th-century Indian male actors
21st-century Indian male actors
Kannada film producers
Film producers from Karnataka
Bharatiya Janata Party politicians from Karnataka
Karnataka MLAs 2004–2007
Karnataka MLAs 2008–2013
Karnataka MLAs 2018–2023